(Henry Roger) Justin Lewis was a lawyer who served as Solicitor General of Fiji from 1956 to 1963, and as Attorney General of Fiji from 1963 to 1970.

Lewis participated in the Marlborough House conference chaired by Eirene White in July 1965, to discuss constitutional reforms. The Fijian delegation consisted of six ethnic Fijians (Ratu Sir George Cakobau, Ratu Sir Edward Cakobau, Ratu Sir Penaia Ganilau, Ratu Sir Kamisese Mara,  Josua Rabukawaqa, and Semesa Sikivou), six Indo-Fijians (Dr. A. D. Patel, Sidiq Koya, James Madhavan, C. A. Shah, Andrew Deoki, and C. P. Singh), and six Europeans (John Falvey, Ronald Kermode, John Moore, John Kearsley, Fred Archibald,  and Cyril Aidney) The Governor, Sir Derek Jakeway, and Lewis himself, as Attorney General, were designated separately. They were joined by a nine-member British delegation.

References

Solicitors-General of Fiji
Attorneys General of the Colony of Fiji
Attorneys-general of Fiji
Year of birth missing
Year of death missing